Auster is a surname. Notable people with the surname include:

Daniel Auster, Mayor of Jerusalem in the final years of the British Mandate of Palestine
Lawrence Auster (1949–2013), American traditionalist conservative blogger and essayist 
Paul Auster, Brooklyn-based author
Sophie Auster (born 1987), American actress and singer

English-language surnames
German toponymic surnames